Rhoda Griffis (born January 9, 1965) is an American actress who has played supporting roles both in independent and mainstream films and television.

Life and career

Griffis appeared onstage in Angels in America, Proof, Collected Stories, and The Dark at the Top of the Stairs.

Her first film role was in the 1992 drama Love Field, in which she played Jacqueline Kennedy. Her non-stage acting debut was in the television movie A Mother's Right: The Elizabeth Morgan Story. She appeared in other made-for-TV films and series - including In the Heat of the Night.

Griffis worked for seven seasons with The North Carolina Shakespeare Festival, for five seasons with Charlotte Rep, as well as appearing with the Saint Louis Repertory, the Alabama Shakespeare Festival, and Theatre by the Sea (Portsmouth, NH). In Atlanta, Griffis has appeared frequently on stage with the Alliance Theatre, Theatrical Outfit, and for three seasons with the Actors Theatre of Atlanta.

Griffis is known for her work in Runaway Jury, Walk the Line, Road Trip, Songcatcher. Among her more recent roles is the feisty Lenore Baker in Lifetime's television drama, Army Wives. In addition, she made memorable appearances in American Summer and One Missed Call.

In between acting work, Griffis teaches on-camera acting, theatre, voice-overs and assistant directs in the fine arts department of The Lovett School in Atlanta, Georgia.

Filmography

References

External links
 

20th-century American actresses
21st-century American actresses
American film actresses
American television actresses
American voice actresses
Actors from Raleigh, North Carolina
Actresses from North Carolina
Living people
1965 births